The Lagos State Ministry of Home Affairs is the state government ministry, charged with the responsibility to plan, devise and implement the state policies on Home Affairs and Culture.

See also
Lagos State Ministry of Tourism, Art and culture
Lagos State Executive Council

References

Government ministries of Lagos State
Subnational culture ministries